Shairon Benjamin Martis (born March 30, 1987) is a Dutch-Curaçaoan professional baseball pitcher for L&D Amsterdam of the Honkbal Hoofdklasse. He has previously pitched for the Washington Nationals and Minnesota Twins of Major League Baseball. Martis was a member of the Netherlands in the 2006 World Baseball Classic and the 2013 World Baseball Classic, as well as the 2011 Baseball World Cup. He played for Team Netherlands in the 2019 European Baseball Championship, at the Africa/Europe 2020 Olympic Qualification tournament in Italy in September 2019.

Amateur and international career
In 2002, Martis was a member of the Curaçao team that claimed the Senior League World Series, which took place in Bangor, Maine.

Martis pitched a no-hitter on March 10, 2006, in the World Baseball Classic against Panama, in a game stopped in the 7th inning due to the mercy rule.

He played for Team Netherlands in the 2017 World Baseball Classic.

He played for Team Netherlands in the 2019 European Baseball Championship, and will compete for it at the Africa/Europe 2020 Olympic Qualification tournament, taking place in Italy beginning September 18, 2019.

Professional career

San Francisco Giants
Martis was signed by the San Francisco Giants in 2004. In 2005, he pitched in 11 games with 5 starts. His record was 2–1 with a 1.85 ERA for the San Francisco Giants' Arizona Rookie League team. Martis began the 2006 season with Augusta in the Low A South Atlantic League, where he accrued a 6–4 record and 3.64 ERA in 15 starts. On July 28, 2006, Martis was traded to the Washington Nationals for veteran lefty reliever Mike Stanton.

Washington Nationals
On July 28, 2006, the Nationals acquired Martis from the San Francisco Giants for veteran lefty reliever Mike Stanton. He joined the roster of Savannah of the South Atlantic League on August 1, 2006. After going 1–1 with a 3.80 ERA in four starts at Savannah, Martis was promoted to Washington's Potomac club in the High A Carolina League. He pitched two games in Potomac, giving up 4 earned runs in 12 innings, and finished the season at Harrisburg in the Double-A Eastern League, allowing 7 earned runs over 5 innings in his only appearance of the Harrisburg season. In , Martis pitched for Potomac the entire season. In 26 starts and one relief appearance, he logged a 4.23 ERA over 151 innings, striking out 108 batters while issuing just 52 walks. Martis was assigned to Harrisburg to begin the  season. After going 4–4 with a 3.98 ERA and a respectable 1.35 WHIP in 14 starts at Harrisburg, he was promoted on June 21 to Triple-A Columbus, where he went 1–2 and accrued a 3.02 ERA in 7 starts, striking out 42 batters and walking 17. He was selected as a member of the World Team for the 2008 All-Star Futures Game in Yankee Stadium. Martis was called up to the major-league roster on September 2, with the intent of assigning him to the bullpen. However, an injury to rotation member Collin Balester caused Martis to put into the starting rotation. He made his major league debut September 4, 2008, against the Atlanta Braves. He gave up 2 runs in 5 innings, getting the loss. He struck out the first batter he faced, Gregor Blanco. Chipper Jones got the first hit off Martis. In his first plate appearance, he drew a walk from Braves rookie James Parr, who, like Martis, was also making his first major-league appearance. Martis struck out Parr in Parr's first at-bat earlier in the game. Martis got his first major league win on September 23, 2008, against the Florida Marlins. On May 2, 2009, against the St. Louis Cardinals, Martis pitched his first career complete game, which was the Nationals' first complete game since Pedro Astacio's in 2006 against the Atlanta Braves.

Pittsburgh Pirates
On November 22, 2011, he signed a minor league contract with the Pittsburgh Pirates.

Minnesota Twins
In June 2012, Minnesota Twins acquired Martis from the Pittsburgh Pirates for a player to be named later or cash. In 9.2 innings he struck out 7, working to a 5.59 ERA. Martis was outrighted off the roster on October 2, 2013.

Uni-President 7-Eleven Lions
On February 26, 2014, Martis signed a 1-yr deal with the Uni-President 7-Eleven Lions of the CPBL.

Bridgeport Bluefish
Martis signed with the Bridgeport Bluefish of the Atlantic League of Professional Baseball for the 2015 season.

Lincoln Saltdogs
On February 15, 2016, Martis resigned with the Lincoln Saltdogs of the American Association of Independent Professional Baseball.

Baltimore Orioles
On April 2, 2017, Martis signed a minor league deal with the Baltimore Orioles organization. He was released on July 19, 2017.

Return to Lincoln Saltdogs
On July 27, 2017, Martis resigned with the Lincoln Saltdogs of the American Association. He was released on November 19, 2019.

L&D Amsterdam
Martis signed with L&D Amsterdam of the Honkbal Hoofdklasse for the 2020 season.

References

External links

, or Retrosheet
Pelota Binaria (Venezuelan Winter League)
Shairon Martis – Official website

Living people
1987 births
2006 World Baseball Classic players
2013 World Baseball Classic players
2015 WBSC Premier12 players
2016 European Baseball Championship players
2017 World Baseball Classic players
2019 European Baseball Championship players
2023 World Baseball Classic players
Águilas del Zulia players
Altoona Curve players
Arizona League Giants players
Augusta GreenJackets players
Baseball players at the 2008 Summer Olympics
Bridgeport Bluefish players
Columbus Clippers players
Curaçao baseball players
Curaçao expatriate baseball players in Taiwan
Curaçao expatriate baseball players in the United States
Dutch people of Curaçao descent
Harrisburg Senators players
Indianapolis Indians players
Lincoln Saltdogs players
Major League Baseball pitchers
Major League Baseball players from Curaçao
Minnesota Twins players
Navegantes del Magallanes players
Curaçao expatriate baseball players in Venezuela
New Britain Rock Cats players
Olympic baseball players of the Netherlands
People from Willemstad
Potomac Nationals players
Rochester Red Wings players
Savannah Sand Gnats players
Syracuse Chiefs players
Tiburones de La Guaira players
Uni-President 7-Eleven Lions players
Washington Nationals players
Curaçao expatriate baseball players in the Dominican Republic
L&D Amsterdam Pirates players
Toros del Este players